Concern Komiavia, later GAP Komiavia or Komiavia State Air Enterprise is a now-defunct Russian airline.

This concern was founded in 1991 by O. G. Chernov. In 1991 Komiavia operated more than 320 airplanes and helicopters, including Mil Mi-8Ts, Mil Mi-10Ks and a number of civil airplanes.

It existed up to August 1992. 

In December 1994 GAP Komiavia was founded by Chernov (December 1994 - February 1997, Chief Director).

Komiavia faded with the rise of UTair Aviation.

In April 1997 the Joint-stock company Komiinteravia was founded on the basis of Komiavia by M. V. Kutuzov.

GAP Komiavia losses increased and it finally went bankrupt, after which the company was transferred to the newly created GAP Komiaviatrans (or Komiaviatrans State Air Enterprise), based in Syktyvkar, Komi.

In May 1998 OJSC Komiinteravia reorganized by merging with Syktyvkar, a subsidiary of GAP Komiavia.
It operated Tu-134s, An-24s and Yak-40s.

References

External links 

Airlines disestablished in 1997
Defunct airlines of Russia
Airlines established in 1991
Companies based in Syktyvkar
1991 establishments in Russia